Carlea is a former Canadian National Railway railway station and hamlet in northeastern Saskatchewan, Canada.

The name Carlea was created from the first few letters of the names of two rivers that meet nearby, the Carrot and the Leather.

References

Connaught No. 457, Saskatchewan
Unincorporated communities in Saskatchewan